Baron Rayleigh, of Terling Place in the County of Essex, is a title in the Peerage of the United Kingdom. It was created on 18 July 1821 for Lady Charlotte Strutt, wife of Colonel Joseph Strutt, Member of Parliament for Maldon.

Joseph Strutt had earlier declined the offer of a peerage, 'under a cloak of false humility', and instead proposed that the honour be given to his wife. She was the daughter of James FitzGerald, 1st Duke of Leinster, and his wife Lady Emily Lennox, the second of the famous Lennox sisters. Her elder brother was Charles FitzGerald, 1st Baron Lecale, and her younger brother was Lord Edward FitzGerald.

The title is currently held by the fourth Baron's grandson, the sixth Baron, who succeeded his uncle in 1988. The family seat is Terling Place in Essex.

Barons Rayleigh (1821)

Charlotte Mary Gertrude Strutt, 1st Baroness Rayleigh (1758–1836)
John James Strutt, 2nd Baron Rayleigh (1796–1873)
John William Strutt, 3rd Baron Rayleigh (1842–1919)
Robert John Strutt, 4th Baron Rayleigh (1875–1947)
John Arthur Strutt, 5th Baron Rayleigh (1908–1988)
John Gerald Strutt, 6th Baron Rayleigh (b. 1960)

The heir apparent is the present holder's son, the Hon. John Frederick Strutt (b. 1993).

Extended family
Notable members of the Strutt family include:
 John Strutt, MP for Maldon from 1774 to 1790
 Charles Hedley Strutt, MP for Maldon and chairman of the Anglo-Dutch Plantations of Java
 Edward Gerald Strutt, son of the second Baron and founder of Strutt & Parker
 Sir Nigel Strutt, former chairman of the Strutt & Parker (Farms) Ltd
 The Hon. Hedley Vicars Strutt, former chairman of Anglo-Indonesian Plantations Ltd between 1964 and 1972

See also
Duke of Leinster
Strutt baronets

References

Baronies in the Peerage of the United Kingdom
People from Terling
1821 establishments in the United Kingdom
Noble titles created in 1821
Strutt family